Pachycoleus is a genus of bugs in the family Dipsocoridae, erected by Franz Xaver Fieber in 1860.  The type species Pachycoleus waltli is recorded from northern Europe including the British Isles.

Species 
According to BioLib the following are included:
 Pachycoleus dogueti Péricart & Matocq, 2004
 Pachycoleus gracilis (Josifov, 1967)
 Pachycoleus japonicus (Miyamoto, 1964)
 Pachycoleus pusillimum (J. Sahlberg, 1870)
 Pachycoleus utnapishtim Linnavuori, 1984
 Pachycoleus waltli Fieber, 1860 - type species

See also
 List of heteropteran bugs recorded in Britain

References

External links
 

Heteroptera genera
Hemiptera of Europe